Curt Goetz (17 November 1888 – 12 September 1960), born Kurt Walter Götz, was a Swiss German writer, actor and film director. He was regarded as one of the most brilliant German comedy writers of his time. With his wife Valérie von Martens, he acted in his own plays and also filmed them. He was a distant relative of Irish writer George Bernard Shaw, to whom he was often compared.

Life and work 
 
Goetz was born in Mainz, Germany the son of Swiss wine examiner Bernhard Götz and his German wife of Italian-French descent, Selma (born Rocco). His father died in 1890. Two-year-old Curt and his mother then moved to Halle, Saxony-Anhalt, where she managed a private clinic.

In 1906 Goetz graduated from City High School in Halle, where he played Franz Moor in The Robbers by Schiller.

His mother remarried, and his stepfather encouraged and financed Goetz's first steps in the theatre. He studied acting under Berlin's Emanuel Reicher. In 1907 he made his stage debut at the Stadttheater in Rostock, and wrote his first sketches for the stage. He played at theatres in Nuremberg, then went to Berlin. In 1912 he played the lead in the silent movie Black Blood, directed by Harry Piel.

In 1914 he married Erna Nitter; they divorced in 1917. He continued acting in silent movies, mainly comedies such as Ich möchte kein Mann sein (I Don't Want To Be A Man, 1918), directed by Ernst Lubitsch. One of his colleagues from that time was actor Max Landa.

In 1923 he married Valérie von Martens in Berlin, whom he met while acting in Vienna, and they toured together, acting in his own productions.

In 1939 he went to Hollywood to study filmmaking, and decided to remain there, with Valérie, when war broke out. He worked with director Reinhold Schunzel and others, and several of his comedies become films. He was signed by MGM
 
and worked on a number of film scripts.  He and Valérie bought a farm in Van Nuys, California, where they successfully bred chickens.

In California, Goetz drafted his tale Tatjana and a new version of his Hokuspokus. He also reworked an older play into The House in Montevideo, which he successfully produced in Broadway's Playhouse Theatre in 1945.

The Goetzes returned to Europe in 1945, living in Switzerland by Lake Thun (Goetz had Swiss nationality from birth), where he wrote some successful novels. They later moved to Liechtenstein.

Goetz died in Grabs, St. Gallen, on 12 September 1960.

Works (originally published in German)

Plays 
 Der Lampenschirm (1911)
 Nachtbeleuchtung (1918, v. 1919) 5 Einakter: Nachtbeleuchtung, Lohengrin, Tobby, Minna Magdalena, Der fliegende Geheimrat
Menagerie (1919) 4 Einakter: Der Spatz vom Dache, Die Taube in der Hand, Der Hund im Hirn, Der Hahn im Korb
Ingeborg (1922)
Die tote Tante und andere Begebenheiten (1924) 3 Einakter: Der Mörder, Das Märchen, Die tote Tante
Hokuspokus (Original) (1926)
Der Lügner und die Nonne (1928)
Frauenarzt Dr. med. Hiob Prätorius (Original) (1934)
Das Haus in Montevideo (1945)
Hokuspokus (Neufassung) (1953)
Dr. med. Hiob Prätorius (Neufassung) (1953)
Nichts Neues in Hollywood (1956)
Miniaturen (1958) 3 Einakter: Die Rache, Herbst, Die Kommode
Seifenblasen (1962) 3 Einakter: Ausbruch des Weltfriedens, Die Bacarole, Die Bärengeschichte

Novels 
Tatjana (1944)
Die Tote von Beverly Hills (1951)

Autobiography 
 Die Memoiren des Peterhans von Binningen (Memoirs Vol. 1, 1960)
 Die Verwandlung des Peterhans von Binningen (Memoirs Vol. 2)
 Wir wandern, wir wandern ... (Memoirs Vol. 3, Reminiscences of Valérie von Martens, 1963)

Other works 
Gesammelte Werke (1958)
Viel Spaß mit Curt Goetz (1964) – Fritz Fröhling
Das große Curt-Goetz-Album, Bilder eines Lebens (1968)
Curt's Geschichten
Ergoetzliches (1974)
Curt Goetz - In deinem Sinne (1982)
Sämtliche Bühnenwerke (1987)

Filmography 
Hokuspokus, directed by Gustav Ucicky (Germany, 1930, based on the play Hokuspokus) 
The Temporary Widow, directed by Gustav Ucicky (UK, 1930, based on the play Hokuspokus) 
Doctor Praetorius, directed by Curt Goetz and Karl Peter Gillmann (West Germany, 1950, based on the play Dr. med. Hiob Prätorius) 
People Will Talk, directed by Joseph L. Mankiewicz (1951, based on the play Dr. med. Hiob Prätorius) 
The House in Montevideo, directed by Curt Goetz and Valerie von Martens (West Germany, 1951, based on the play Das Haus in Montevideo) 
Hocuspocus, directed by Kurt Hoffmann (West Germany, 1953, based on the play Hokuspokus) 
Ingeborg, directed by Wolfgang Liebeneiner (West Germany, 1960, based on the play Ingeborg) 
The House in Montevideo, directed by Helmut Käutner (West Germany, 1963, based on the play Das Haus in Montevideo) 
Dead Woman from Beverly Hills, directed by Michael Pfleghar (West Germany, 1964, based on the novel Die Tote von Beverly Hills) 
Praetorius, directed by Kurt Hoffmann (West Germany, 1965, based on the play Dr. med. Hiob Prätorius) 
Hocuspocus, directed by Kurt Hoffmann (West Germany, 1966, based on the play Hokuspokus) 
, directed by Rolf Thiele (West Germany, 1967, based on the play Der Lügner und die Nonne)

Screenplays
 Friedrich Schiller (dir. Curt Goetz, 1923)
 Lucky Kids (dir. Paul Martin, 1936)
 Les gais lurons (dir. Paul Martin and Jacques Natanson, 1936)
 Land of Love (dir. Reinhold Schünzel, 1937)
 Seven Slaps (dir. Paul Martin, 1937)
 Napoleon Is to Blame for Everything (dir. Curt Goetz, 1938)

Directing
 Friedrich Schiller (1923)
 Napoleon Is to Blame for Everything (1938)
 Doctor Praetorius (1950)
 The House in Montevideo (1951)

Acting
 Schwarzes Blut (1912)
 Nur nicht heiraten (1915)
 Der Hund mit dem Monokel (1916)
 Fliegende Schatten (1916)
 Rose of the Wilderness (1918)
 Imprisoned Soul (1918) as Stefan Rainer
 Fantasie des Aristide Caré (1918) as Gentleman / Einbrecher Aristide Caré
 I Don't Want to Be a Man (1918) as Dr. Kersten
 Katinka (1918)
 Ruth's Two Husbands (1919) as Robert Holversen
 The Revenge of Count Silvain (1920) as Count Silvain
 Das Skelett des Herrn Markutius (1920) as Detektiv Joe Deebs
 The Lady in Black (1920) as Joe Deebs
 Tragedy of Love (1923) as Prosecutor
 Die Gräfin von Paris (1923) as Staatsanwalt
 All for Money (1923) as Graf Ehrhardt
 Napoleon Is to Blame for Everything (1938) as Lord Arthur Cavershoot
 Doctor Praetorius (1950) as Dr. Hiob Prätorius
 The House in Montevideo (1951) as Professor Traugott Nägler
 Hocuspocus (1953) as Peer Bille

References

External links 

Curt Goetz and Valérie von Martens 

1888 births
1960 deaths
Mass media people from Mainz
German male film actors
Film people from Rhineland-Palatinate
German male stage actors
Swiss writers in German
Swiss male stage actors
20th-century Swiss male actors
German emigrants to Liechtenstein
Swiss male film actors
Swiss male silent film actors
20th-century German male actors
Swiss dramatists and playwrights
German male dramatists and playwrights
20th-century German dramatists and playwrights
Actors from Mainz